Adnan Badran (born 15 December 1935) is a Jordanian politician and academic. He was the 35th Prime Minister of Jordan from 6 April 2005 to 27 November 2005.

Early life and education
Badran was born in Jerash, Jordan (then located in the Emirate of Transjordan, a part of the British Empire) on 15 December 1935. He received his bachelor of science from Oklahoma State University (1959) and his MS and PhD degrees from Michigan State University (1963). Badran's brother, Mudar Badran, is a politician in Jordan and served as prime minister several times.

Professor and politics
In 1987, Badran was appointed first Secretary General of the country's Higher Council for Science and Technology, the president of which is Prince Hassan.

He was agriculture minister and education minister briefly during the late 1980s. During the 1990s he became president of the Arab Academy of Sciences and the Philadelphia University of Jordan, positions that he still holds. From 1994 to 1998, he was deputy director of UNESCO.

Badran was appointed prime minister on 7 April 2005 by King Abdullah II as part of a new government which was to be more reformist than previous governments. Badran also became defense minister in the new government. After seven months, however, he and his government resigned over the slow progress of reforms and the frustration caused by the hotel bombings in Amman on 9 November 2005.

Badran was the president of Petra University. In September 2014, he became Chancellor at the university. He was the president of Yarmouk University. Badran is a Fellow and former Vice-President of The World Academy of Sciences. In July 2009, Badran with Moneef R. Zou'bi published the UNESCO Science Report 2010 on the Arab States. Badran was awarded Honorary Doctorates by Sungkyunkwan University (1981), Michigan State University (2007), and Yarmouk University (2014). He is the author of 120 publications, including 22 books, and holds 4 patents.

Personal life
Badran resides in Dabouq. He has six children and seven grandchildren. On 1 April 2019, Badran's wife, Maha, died after a long illness at age 67.

See also
 List of prime ministers of Jordan

References

External links
 Oral History Interview with Adnan Badran, Oklahoma Oral History Research Program at the OSU Library
UNESCO SCIENCE REPORT 2010 The Current Status of Science around the World

1935 births
Living people
Michigan State University alumni
University of Jordan alumni
People from Jerash
Prime Ministers of Jordan
Heads of universities in Jordan
Government ministers of Jordan
Agriculture ministers of Jordan
Defence ministers of Jordan
Education ministers of Jordan
Academic staff of Petra University
Academic staff of Philadelphia University (Jordan)
Palestine Technical University alumni